Emil Anneke (Emil Carl Friedrich Wilhelm Annecke; December 13, 1823 in Dortmund – October 27, 1888 in Bay City, Michigan, United States) was a German revolutionary and Forty-Eighter and American journalist, lawyer and politician (Republican Party). From 1863 until 1866 he served as Michigan Auditor General, the first Republican serving in that position. Emil was the younger brother of U.S. colonel and former German revolutionary commander Fritz Anneke, his sister-in-law was the famous German-American writer, college founder, abolitionist and suffragette Mathilde Anneke.

Literature 
 Michigan Historical Commission: Michigan biographies, including members of Congress [...]. Band I, Michigan Historical Commission, Lansing 1924
 John Andrew Russell: The Germanic Influence in the Making of Michigan. University, Detroit 1927
 Heinrich Annecke: "Die Bauernfamilie Annecke in Schadeleben und ihre Stammfolge." In: Deutsches Familienarchiv. Band 13, 1960, p. 116–140 (p. 129 briefly about Emil Carl Friedrich Wilhelm Annecke)

External links 
 Office of the Auditor General, State of Michigan 
 Detailed Biography of Emil Anneke
 Michigan State Archives: Documents about a vendetta against Anneke in 1864

Politicians from Dortmund
German-American Forty-Eighters
German revolutionaries
1823 births
1888 deaths
19th-century American newspaper editors
German emigrants to the United States
Michigan Republicans
Michigan Auditors General
People from the Province of Westphalia
American male journalists
19th-century American male writers